Cash Run (born 1997) is an American Thoroughbred racing filly. In 1999, she won the Breeders' Cup Juvenile Fillies and finished second in Eclipse Award balloting to Chilukki. She won the Bonnie Miss Stakes and Davona Dale Stakes at Gulfstream Park in the first part of her 3-year-old season, but her form dropped off sharply after that. She ran third in two stakes in her next eight races, and was retired with five wins from 17 starts. She was retired for stud in 2001.

Pedigree

 indicates inbreeding

References

1997 racehorse births
Thoroughbred family 13-c
Racehorses bred in Kentucky
Racehorses trained in the United States
Breeders' Cup Juvenile Fillies winners